Ridgway Township may refer to the following townships in the United States:

 Ridgway Township, Elk County, Pennsylvania
 Ridgway Township, Gallatin County, Illinois

See also 
 Ridgeway Township, Michigan